Bulinus globosus is a species of a tropical freshwater snail with a sinistral shell, an aquatic gastropod mollusk in the family Planorbidae, the ramshorn snails and their allies.

Parasites
Bulinus globosus is an intermediary host of Schistosoma haematobium, along with Bulinus truncatus.

References

Further reading

External links 

Bulinus
Gastropods described in 1866